John Septimus Roe Anglican Community School (commonly abbreviated as JSRACS or JSR) is an independent Anglican co-educational primary and secondary day school, located in Perth, Western Australia.

The school is named after the notable West Australian and first Surveyor-General of Western Australia, John Septimus Roe. It is the largest member of the Anglican Schools Commission and is also noted for having the longest name of any school in Western Australia.

History

The first campus, originally named Thomas Scott Anglican Community School, was established in Beechboro in 1990 when it took over the old Northside Christian School at the request of the State Government. The second campus, located in Mirrabooka, was opened in 1992 and exists as a combined primary and secondary school campus.

While in the beginning, the two schools shared the same administration and school council, there existed a separate cultural identity. To this day, there is a playful rivalry between the primary schools' students, particularly in sporting events and the move to the upper school campus. As such in 1996, Thomas Scott Anglican Community School was renamed John Septimus Roe Anglican Community School to mark the new concept of "two campuses, one school". However, in February 2021, the school's executive management announced plans detailing the merging of both campuses, with Beechboro set to cease operations at the conclusion of the 2022 school year. The partial redevelopment of the Mirrabooka Campus' facilities will accompany this, which will be seen in the form of a new Year 9 and 10 learning space and heavily expanded, modernised primary facilities.

Principal Matthew Hughes placed great emphasis on the modernisation of the school's facilities throughout his term. For example, 2005 saw the completion of the updated Ken Evans Science Building, while saw 2007 the opening of the newly created Catherine O'Neill library, named in honour of the Foundation Principal of the school. Following this in 2008, the modernised ICT Centre completed its renovation, having formerly served as an administration building. This was followed by the new Middle School Learning Community in 2009 and a raft of new classrooms including the new 'Senior Learning Centre' which was completed in 2014.

Today the primary school campus at Beechboro and Kindergarten to Year 12 Mirrabooka campus has a student population of nearly 2,000 students from Kindergarten to Year 12.

In early 2012 the long-awaited internal road system was finished, which was followed by the completion of the Chapel of St Paul's renovation, adding new facilities and a vestry. In 2015, the Mathematics and Year 10 facility, 'D Block,' completed its redevelopment, and the central cafeteria was too reopened after extensive renovations. 2014 saw the opening of the sizeable Senior Learning Centre, catering for Year 11 and 12 students. Future projects include a redevelopment of the Primary Schooling facilities and the creation of a new learning space that will house Mathematics classrooms, as well Year 9 and 10 students.

The school's crest is also highly meaningful, with points of interest including:

 A bishop's mitre represents the authority of the Anglican Archbishop of Perth over the school as part of the Anglican Schools Commission.
 The St George's Cross indicates the Anglican Church's link with the Church of England.
 The Bible was the basis of the Christian beliefs and values system.
 An oil lamp represents light and knowledge.
 The handle signifies Chi Rho - the letters of the word "Christ".

School Houses
The school is divided into six houses each with different colours and mascots:

 Durham Knights (Blue) - named after Roe's home in England
 Kelmscott Cougars (Green) - named after the ship in which Roe came to Australia
 Newbury Lions (Purple) named after Roe's birthplace
 Parmelia Eagles (Black) - named after Roe's ship
 Roebourne Dragons (Red) - named after Roe's ship
 Sandleford Sharks (Yellow) - named after Roe's former property back in England

The two newer houses, Parmelia and Newbury, were introduced on Wednesday 21 April 2010. The mascot, colour and emblem were decided by new members of the house by a popular vote.

In the Secondary School, each house contains one pastoral care group (PCG) per year group, and this group is assigned a PCG tutor, who remains with them throughout their high school journey. In Year 7, students are educated in the Year 7 and 8 Middle School Learning Community, providing them a chance to socialise with the Year 8 students and become part of the JSRACS community.  This new Pastoral care system was introduced in 2010, under which each year group comprises six PCG groups, one for each house. At JSRACS, there are many inter-house competitions, the most notable being the Swimming, Cross-Country and Athletics Carnivals. There are also minor competitions including music festivals, theatresports, inter-house signing and hymn singing. Points earned from competitions go towards the annual Ivan Jordanoff Interhouse Shield.

Campus
The school is currently located at two sites. The original campus at Beechboro caters for primary school students while the newer, larger campus in Mirrabooka ranges from kindergarten to Year 12. Each location has a school chapel: at Beechboro this is St Bede's Chapel, and at Mirrabooka, St Paul's. Both sites include canteens, libraries, oval spaces and gymnasiums. There are however plans to merge the two campuses at the end of the 2022 schooling year, which will accompany the rejuvenation and redevelopment of some of the Mirrabooka campus facilities.

The Catherine O'Neill Library at the Mirrabooka Campus is particularly notable for its size, boasting two floors and a collection of several thousand books. Attached to the library is the ICT centre containing two computer labs, offices, and a media room. The Matthew Hughes Performing Arts Centre has a dedicated tiered-theatre, music practice rooms, offices and an organ room. The PAC also features a dance theatre, change rooms, green room, sizable backstage area and a cafe, catering for all students and teachers. The 'Meet n' Eat Cafe' is operated by Hospitality Trainees and catering staff, and is open before and after school, as well as at recess and lunch times. The Mirrabooka gymnasium contains two full-sized basketball courts, a mezzanine level (used as a personal training area), offices, kitchens, storerooms and two classrooms. This gym is also the main assembly building on the campus and is used for large-scale events such as Founders' Day and Presentation Nights. The Ken Evans Science Building features eight 'laboratories', offices, a Laboratory room and a special open-plan laboratory for interactive science. The Middle School Learning Community features 12 classrooms, staff lounges and offices, which all span off of a spacious common area with lounges and a kitchenette. The school grounds are beautifully landscaped and buildings surround the central Carnley Court named after former Archbishop of Perth, Peter Carnley.

The Beechboro campus' gymnasium, the Michael Brommilow Centre, features one full-size basketball court, offices, change rooms, storage, kitchens, and is also used as the major assembly area at the Beechboro campus. The Beechboro campus also features many classrooms specifically tailored to suit each year level in the primary years of schooling.

Curriculum
The primary school curriculum follows that imposed by the State Government, focusing on numeracy and literacy.

Music is a key element of life at JSRACS, and this is encouraged throughout the school. In the Primary School, all Year 2 students learn a string instrument as part of the 'Year 2 String Program' and all Year 5 students learn a concert band instrument as part of the 'Year 5 Band Program'.

Study in the senior secondary years is reflective of the guidelines set down by the School Curriculum and Standards Authority (SCSA). Year 10 is viewed as a transition and preparation year between the middle and secondary schools. Students are streamed into Mathematics, English, Humanities and Social Sciences, and Science courses, according to achievement from the years before (i.e. a student who has a high English score in Year 9 will be placed in the Year 10 English: Advanced course, whereas one with a poor one would learn the Year 10 English: Essentials course). Year 10 students can also study a range of elective subjects including Design and Technology, LOTE courses, theatre arts, dance, media studies, ICT courses and music.

In Year 11 and 12, students study six courses, with four 55-minute periods of each course each week. These courses can be all ATAR courses, all General courses, or a combination of both with some Certificate and VET courses, such as CareerLink.

The school offers a broad and developed variety of ATAR subject courses, such as:

 Accounting and Finance ATAR;
 Applied Information Technology ATAR;
 Biology ATAR;
 Chemistry ATAR;
 Computer Science ATAR;
 Dance ATAR;
 Drama ATAR;
 Economics ATAR;
 Engineering Studies ATAR;
 English ATAR:
 Geography ATAR;
 Human Biology ATAR;
 Indonesian: Second Language ATAR;
 Literature ATAR;
 Mandarin: Second Language ATAR 
 Mathematics: Applications ATAR;
 Mathematics: Methods ATAR;
 Mathematics: Specialist ATAR;
 Media Production and Analysis ATAR;
 Modern History ATAR;
 Music ATAR;
 Physical Education Studies ATAR;
 Physics ATAR;
 Religion and Life ATAR; and
 Visual Arts ATAR.

For those who are looking at TAFE options or apprenticeships, the CareerLink allows students to get first-hand experience out in the workforce, and can even study off campus, at TAFEs around Western Australia.

All year groups undertake compulsory religious and values education up to and including Year 10 of their schooling at JSRACS. After this time the subject becomes optional, and can be studied as an ATAR course or a General course.

Co-curricular activities

Co-curricular activities are a vital part of an education at John Septimus Roe Anglican Community School. In the primary school, sporting teams are the most popular for students, with JSR fielding netball, football, soccer, softball and many other sports.

Music and Drama are also available, with instrumentalists encouraged to join the Wind Band or Septissimo Strings, whilst vocalists are invited to join the Primary Choir. The St Paul's Chapel Choir, as mentioned before, is an exclusive group of talented vocalists who tour Perth, interstate, and internationally.

Once a year, the primary school put on a Pantomime. Primary school students also have the option to participate in Wakikirri, a Junior Rock Eisteddfod festival.

In the middle and senior schools, art students can join the lunchtime Art Club, and participate in Interhouse Chalk-Drawing competition. Students who enjoy dance are invited to participate in the Dance Club, which meets once weekly, after school. Choreography Night is a dance night planned and run by the Year 12 Dance students, which includes over 120 performers from years 7–12. Dances are choreographed mainly by Year 12 ATAR Dance students and form part of their assessment for this course. LOTE department activities include cultural exchanges to Bali and Italy, as well as the Annual Harmony Week Fair, where different cultures are shown off and exhibited. The school magazine was started in 2010.

In Year 11, selected students are invited into the smARTS programme, run by the University of Western Australia. This programme has students meet on campus at UWA and online, and take part in researching prevalent issues facing society. This research project is then submitted to a UWA panel who judge the best project. The research culminates in a Presentation Night, where the students summarise their 10,000-word projects into five-minute videos, skits, speeches etc. JSRACS students have succeeded in the past, with teams in 2007, 2008 and 2010 winning overall.

All students are encouraged to take part in sporting teams at the secondary level. Years 7, 8, 9 and 10 are eligible to participate in ACC sport in terms 1 and 2, where students face students from other ACC schools. JSRACS has won the Summer, Winter and Overall NWAS Series for the past 10 years. Students who excel in swimming, cross country and athletics are also selected into the JSR team for that sport and represent the school in ACC Inter-school Carnivals. As of the 2021 school year, JSR are in C Division for Swimming and B Division for Athletics. JSR has finished in the top 15 out of over 100 schools in the Inter-school Cross Country for the past few years. JSRACS has excelled in Athletics, advancing from C Division to A Division over three years. In 2009, their first year in A Division, JSR placed 2nd behind Sacred Heart College. In 2010, JSR cemented its status in A Division with a solid 3rd placing.

There is a Sydney and Canberra trip for students, offered biannually, an annual Bali trip and an annual Japanese Ski Trip, visiting Melbourne and Mount Hotham. There are also one-off school trips, such as to China, Vietnam, New Zealand, Dubai, Germany, Austria and Singapore as well as Melbourne, Avalon and Adelaide.

There are many music ensembles, bands, choirs and groups to join. These include:

 Bagpipe Band
 Barbershop Quartet
 Beechboro & Mirrabooka Primary Choir
 Big Night in Events
 Clarinet Ensemble
 Guitar Ensemble
 Secondary Choir
 Senior Concert Band
 Senior Jazz Band
 Septimus Swing
 Septissimo Strings 
 Sinfonia
 St Pauls Chapel Choir
 Wind Band
 Year 2 String Orchestra
 Year 5 Bands

These ensembles are very popular and involve some 250 students. Since 2008, music ensembles have begun touring, with the Senior Concert Band to New Zealand in 2008, the Secondary Choir to Germany and Austria in 2009, the Wind Band and Septissimo Strings to Singapore in 2010 and the Chapel Choir to the United Kingdom in 2011. 2012 saw the Jazz Band visit Mount Gambier, South Australia to compete in the Generations in Jazz Festival. A combined JSRACS and other ASC schools orchestra planned to go to Eastern Europe in 2013, visiting Russia, Poland, Hungary and the Czech Republic.

In 2000, the school entered the Rock Eisteddfod Challenge for the first time, winning first place in the Perth Grand Final the following year. Many students are involved in all aspects of the preparation, dancing and backstage tasks involved in the performance. The school only participated every second year until 2007.

Drama is the other major co-curricular activity. The Drama department puts on a number of shows over the year:
 Annual musical production and play
2000 - Lockie Leonard: Human Torpedo
2000 - Away
2001 - Wolfstock
2002 - Two Weeks with the Queen
2002 - Hating Alison Ashley
2003 - Looking for Alibrandi
2003 - Boss of the Pool
2004 - Così
2004 - The Hunchback of Nostradamus
2005 - Gumshoe
2005 - Picnic at Hanging Rock
2006 - The Man of Steel
2007 - Oliver!
2008 - The Servant of Two Masters
2008 - The Sound of Music
2009 - Pride and Prejudice
2009 - How to Succeed in Business Without Really Trying
2010 - Sweeney Todd: The Demon Barber of Fleet Street
2011 - A Midsummer Night's Dream
2011 - The Pajama Game
2012 - The Mikado
2012 - Stories from Suburban Road
2013 - The Comedy of Errors

2013 - Bugsy Malone
                                             
2014 - Joseph and the Amazing Technicolour Dreamcoat

2015 - Guys and Dolls
                                                 
2016 - Grease

2017 - The Wedding Singer

2018 - Grimm's Tales

2019 - Legally Blonde

2020 - A Midsummer Night's Dream

2021 - We Will Rock You

2022 - Bye Bye Birdie

2023 - Charlie and the Chocolate Factory
 Choreography Night
 Dance Night
 Year 12 Original Solo Performance (OSP) Night
 Interhouse TheatreSports

The musical productions involve over 100 students in acting, orchestra or backstage. Musicals run for four nights, whilst plays run for three full houses. Choreography Night runs over three nights, with the last two nights featuring a teacher's dance.

Statue and portraits
In 2009, as part of the annual Founders' Day celebrations to commemorate the school's 20th year, the school's then-principal Matthew Hughes JP commissioned the creation of a statue of John Septimus Roe in his youth. The sculpture was later changed to be of Roe during the early years of his work as the Surveyor General. In 2010, the school commissioned a portrait of principal Matthew Hughes, which will set the precedent for all future principals to have a portrait painted of them to be hung in the school's library.

Notable alumni
 Joel Corey, AFL, Geelong Football Club
 Liam O'Connor, Cricket, Adelaide Strikers, Western Warriors
 Dana Hooker, AFLW, Fremantle Football Club, West Coast Eagles 
 Courtney Guard, AFLW, Fremantle Football Club, West Coast Eagles
 Charlie Thomas, AFLW, West Coast Eagles

References

External links

 JSRACS official homepage
 Australian Rock Eisteddfod Challenge website

Anglican primary schools in Perth, Western Australia
Rock Eisteddfod Challenge participants
Anglican Schools Commission
Anglican secondary schools in Perth, Western Australia
Educational institutions established in 1990
1990 establishments in Australia